George Thomas (born 15 April 1966) is a former badminton player from Kerala, India. He won the National Singles title in 1990 and the doubles title with Jaseel P. Ismail in 1992. He was a member of the Indian team that won a silver medal in the 1998 Commonwealth Games. He was conferred with the Arjuna Award in 2002 for his contribution to Indian Badminton.
He is at present working for Bharat Petroleum Corporation Limited and is posted at Kochi.

Achievements

IBF International

Career
George began his career by playing for the University of Calicut.

References

Indian male badminton players
Indian national badminton champions
Sportspeople from Kochi
Recipients of the Arjuna Award
1966 births
Living people
University of Calicut alumni
Commonwealth Games medallists in badminton
Commonwealth Games silver medallists for India
Badminton players at the 1998 Commonwealth Games
Racket sportspeople from Kerala
Medallists at the 1998 Commonwealth Games